Anne Dacre may refer to:

 Anne Howard, Countess of Arundel, née Anne Dacre, (1557–1630), English poet, noblewoman, and religious conspirator
Anne, Lady Dacre (died 1595), English gentlewoman and benefactress